Scoparia chiasta is a moth in the family Crambidae. It was described by Edward Meyrick in 1885. It is found in Australia, where it has been recorded from New South Wales.

The wingspan is 14–17 mm. The forewings are white, irrorated (sprinkled) with fuscous and dark fuscous and with a short dark fuscous streak from the base of the costa parallel to the inner margin. The first line is white, posteriorly margined with dark fuscous. The second line is white, margined with dark fuscous. The hindwings are pale whitish grey, greyer on the hindmargin and towards the apex. Adults have been recorded on wing from May to August.

References

Moths described in 1885
Scorparia